Filomeno is both a given name and a surname of Italian, Portuguese and Spanish origin. Notable people with the name include:

People with the given name
Filomeno Codiñera (1939–2016), Filipino baseball player
Filomeno da Paixão de Jesus (born 1953), East Timorese politician
Filomeno do Nascimento Vieira Dias (born 1958), Angolan prelate of the Catholic Church
Filomeno Maria Garcia Ozorio (1892–1937), Hong Kong–Portuguese doctor
Filomeno Orbeta Caseñas (1888–1944), Filipino politician
Filomeno Ormeño Belmonte (1899–1975), Peruvian composer

People with the middle name
Benigno Filomeno de Rojas (1821—1865), Dominican politician and lawyer
Carlos Filomeno Agostinho das Neves (born 1953), Santomean politician
José Filomeno dos Santos (born 1978), Angolan businessman

People with the surname
Lucio Filomeno (born 1980), Argentine footballer
Marco Filomeno (born 1965), Italian footballer

See also
Filomena, feminine equivalent
Filomeno Mata, a municipality in Veracruz, Mexico
Filomeno Mata Totonac, a language spoken in Filomeno Mata, Mexico

Italian masculine given names
Portuguese masculine given names
Spanish masculine given names
Italian-language surnames
Portuguese-language surnames
Spanish-language surnames